Blond Ambition or Blonde Ambition may refer to:
 Blond Ambition World Tour, a 1990 concert tour by Madonna
 Blonde Ambition (novel), a 2004 novel written under the pseudonym Zoey Dean
 Blonde Ambition, a 2007 romantic comedy
 Blonde Ambition: The Untold Story Behind Anna Nicole Smith's Death, a 2007 biography by Rita Cosby